is a railway station on the Tokaido Shinkansen in the city of Fuji, Shizuoka, Japan, operated by Central Japan Railway Company (JR Central).

Lines
A connecting bus service runs several times an hour taking approximately 7 minutes.

Station layout
Shin-Fuji Station is an elevated station with two opposed side platforms, connected to one another and to the station building by an underpass. The station building has automated ticket machines, automated turnstiles, and a "Midori no Madoguchi" staffed ticket office.

Platforms

History
Shin-Fuji Station opened on March 13, 1988, and is one of the Shinkansen stations which was opened due to petition by local municipalities. The city of Fuji paid for half of the construction costs, with surrounding municipalities, local industries, Shizuoka Prefecture, and the Sōka Gakkai religious organization paying for the remaining costs.

Passenger statistics
In fiscal 2017, the station was used by an average of 4818 passengers daily (boarding passengers only).

Surrounding area
The station is located in an industrial area, initially with few residences, stores, or connecting lines. There are buses from Shin-Fuji Station directly to the fifth Station on Mount Fuji. The trip is 2 hours and 40 minutes.

See also
 List of railway stations in Japan

References

Yoshikawa, Fumio. Tokaido-sen 130-nen no ayumi. Grand-Prix Publishing (2002) .

External links

  
Official website (in English)

Railway stations in Shizuoka Prefecture
Railway stations in Japan opened in 1988
Stations of Central Japan Railway Company
Fuji, Shizuoka